The 1990 Gent–Wevelgem was the 52nd edition of the Gent–Wevelgem cycle race and was held on 4 April 1990. The race started in Ghent and finished in Wevelgem. The race was won by Herman Frison of the Histor–Sigma team.

General classification

References

Gent–Wevelgem
1990 in road cycling
1990 in Belgian sport